Solomon Adun Asemota SAN (born 8 December 1938) is a Nigerian lawyer and human rights activist. He is the Founder and Principal Partner of the Law Firm of Solomon Asemota & Co., (since 1970), Barristers and Solicitors, with offices in Benin City, Lagos, Port Harcourt, Abuja and London. He has written several publications dedicated towards effecting a change in the state of the Nation. He became a Senior Advocate of Nigeria (SAN) in 1986. As the Nation Chairman of the National Christian Elders’ Forum (NCEF), he has made a lot of strides regarding  Democracy and freedom for Christians in Nigeria.

Early life and education 
Solomon Adun Asemota was born on December 8, 1938 in Benin City, the capital of Edo State, Southern Nigeria. His early formal education began in 1945 at St. Luke School, Jos before he completed his secondary school education in 1948 at Immaculate Conception College, Benin City. He attended Southern Police College, Ikeja, Lagos (1959 - 1960) (Cadet Sub-Inspectors’ Course) before going to Wakefield Police College, Yorkshire, England in 1962 for Advanced Police Training and Scottish Police College, Kincardine Aloa, Scotland in 1969 for Senior Officers Training in organisation and management.

He attended the University of Lagos between 1964 and 1969 where he obtained his Bachelor of Law (Honours) degree in 1969. In 1970, he was called to bar and became a barrister at Law after completing at the Nigerian Law School.

Career 
The Nigerian Police Force

He was enlisted into the Nigerian Police Force as a Cadet Sub-Inspector: Course No.6 in 1959. After training, was posted to Ikeja Province where he served first, as prosecutor, at the Chief Magistrate’s Court Ikeja, in Chief Magistrate Mason Begho’s Court. Later, he was a Course Officer, Man O’ War Bay in Victoria Cameroons, 1961. He then became a prosecutor, Chief Magistrate’s Court Sapele in Chief Magistrates Olayinka Odumosu and Sikiru Abina Courts, as they then were, 1961 before becoming Inspector, Administration then Second-in-Command Traffic Division, and later Crime Branch at Ikeja provincial Police Department, also in 1961.

In 1962, he was promoted to the rank of an Assistant Superintendent of Police, and designated Chief Officer Local Government Police Ondo North (Comprising, Ekiti, Akoko and Owo Divisions which now constitute about half of Ondo State), where he performed duties of Divisional Police Officer, in charge of 800 L.S. Police men & 26 Police Stations. He was seconded (for 6 months in 1963) to the United Nations Operation (ONUC) in the Congo now Zaire. He served in Leopoldville now Kinshasa and later Second-in-Command (Police) at Luluaburg now Katanga.

He became the Aide-de-Camp to the First Governor of Midwest Region, Chief Jereton Mariere 1963 - 1964. Later left for the Southern Police College Ikeja and became the Course Officer, Cadet Sub-Inspector Course and Sergeants Promotion Courses at the Advanced Training Wing. 1964 - 1966. One of his students Ibrahim Coomassie later became the Inspector General of Police, while five others got to the rank of Assistant Inspector General of Police (AIGs).

He was the Second-in-Command 1966 – 1968 at the National Bureau of the Interpol, Central C.I.D. Alagbon Close, Ikoyi, Lagos, and was, at one time, the Investigator attached to Tribunals of Inquiry into E.C.N. and the Ports Authority. He was promoted to the rank of Deputy Superintendent of Police and was a member of the Nigeria Police Officers Delegation to Interpol Conference in Addis Ababa, Ethiopia in 1967. He was later transferred to the Crime Division as Second-in-Command.

In 1969, he was promoted to the rank of Superintendent and was appointed Officer-in Charge, Detective Training School, Ikoyi, Lagos.

He resigned from the Nigeria Police Force in October 1970, to practice Law.

Law

He was appointed Secretary to the Nigerian Bar Association, Benin Branch, 1974 - 1978. He became the National Treasurer, Nigerian Bar Association. 1978 - 1980 then Secretary, Finance Committee, Sixth Commonwealth Law Conference - 1980. He was a Member of the General Council of the Bar 1978 - 1984. He became a Visiting Lecturer for Courses in Civil Procedure at the Institute of Advanced Legal Studies - 1985.

Then he was a Member of the Council of Legal Education 1979 - 1985. He became a Member, Disciplinary Committee, of the General Council of the Bar, 1990 to 1995 and Member, Legal Practitioners Privileges Committee 1991 - 1993 (the committee that confers the rank of Senior Advocate of Nigeria on Lawyers).

He became a Senior Advocate of Nigeria (SAN) in 1986.

At various points in his career he represented Elf Petroleum Nigeria Ltd, Dumez Nigeria Ltd., Elf Oil Nig. Ltd., Bight Engineering Ltd., Life Flour Mill Ltd. Sapele, Nigeria Police Force,  State Security Services, University of Benin, Oil Mineral producing Area Development Commission (OMPADEC).

He was also the personal lawyer to General Yakubu Gowon, whom he still represents till date. Other notable mentions include Hon. Anthony Aniagolu, retired Justice of the Supreme Court, Alhaji Shehu Shagari, former President of Nigeria, Justice Ovie-Whiskey, 1983 Chairman, FEDECO, Sunday Adewusi, former Inspector-General of Police at the Judicial Inquiry into the activities of the Defunct FEDECO. Acted for Alhaji Abubakar Rimi, former Governor of Kano State and Chief Jim Nwobodo former Governor of Anambra State for their release from prison 1986.

He is the Founder and Principal Partner of the Law Firm of Solomon Asemota & Co., (since 1970), Barristers and Solicitors, with offices in Benin City, Lagos, Port Harcourt, Abuja and London.

Recognition 

 Independence medal 1960.
 ONUC Medal (Congo) 1962.
 Republican Medal 1963.
 Civil War Medal 1970.

Honours
 Jubilee Alumnus Award, Law Faculty, University of Lagos for outstanding achievement in the society 1987.
 Distinguished Merit Award, Edo State University, Ekpoma 1996.
 CAN Merit Award November 1999.

Publications
 “Nigerian’s Securities and Exchange Commission Act 1979” (In the International Business Lawyer; Journal of the Section on Business Law of the International Bar Association, October, 1981 Vol.9);
 “Free and Fair Election: Key to stability of party government in Nigeria” 4 and 5 above are published in “Current State of Affairs” an International Features Magazine June and October Editions 1992;
 A Chapter in the Book - policing Nigeria Past, Present and Future. Policing under Civilian and Military Administrations 1993;
The struggle for Justice – 2001 publication;
nt of Nigeria at the meeting of the Representatives of the Laity, Archdiocese of Lagos at IWOPIN on Friday July 14, 2006;
 Ojukwu and the Ethnic Nationalities Movement of Nigeria by Solomon Asemota SAN November 28, 2011;
 Constitutional Development Options for Sustainable Development in Nigeria, January 2017;

References 

1937 births
Living people
People from Edo State
Nigerian human rights activists
20th-century Nigerian lawyers
Senior Advocates of Nigeria